Nallamala Forest is located in the Indian state of Andhra Pradesh and Telangana. It is part of the Eastern Ghats. Nagarjunsagar-Srisailam Tiger Reserve the largest tiger reserve in India and spread over five districts of Nandyala, Prakasam, Guntur, Nalgonda and Mahabub Nagar
falls under it.

See also
Nallamala Hills

References

Landforms of Andhra Pradesh
Forests of India